Bakersfield Heart Hospital is a hospital in Bakersfield, California, United States, specializing in the diagnosis and treatment of heart and vascular disease as well as a wide range of other medical and surgical procedures. The hospital also offers a full service emergency department, total joint program and accredited stroke center. With over 300 employees, the highly trained clinical and medical staff focus on patient-centered care. Bakersfield Heart Hospital has over 20 of the leading cardiologists and cardiothoracic and vascular surgeons in Bakersfield.

Accreditation
 Bakersfield Heart Hospital has received and maintained accreditation from The Joint Commission, the nation's leading hospital review board.
 Accredited Chest Pain Center – Society of Chest Pain Centers
 Accredited Stroke Center

Awards
 Bakersfield Heart Hospital was rated by CareChex for 2013
 Top 10% in the Nation for Cardiac Care
 Top 10% in the State for Interventional Coronary Care
 Number 1 in the Market for Patient Satisfaction in: Overall Hospital Care, Major Cardiac Surgery, Heart Attack Treatment

See also
 List of hospitals in California

References

External links
 

Hospitals in Kern County, California
Buildings and structures in Bakersfield, California